Permissive is a 1970 British exploitation drama film directed by Lindsay Shonteff, written by Jeremy Craig Dryden, and starring Maggie Stride, Gay Singleton and Gilbert Wynne. The film depicts a young girl's progress through the rock music groupie subculture of the time.

Synopsis
Suzy (Maggie Stride) arrives in London with nowhere to stay. She meets a friend, Fiona (Gay Singleton), a groupie who has settled into a relationship with Lee (Alan Gorrie), bass player and singer with the band Forever More. At first Suzy is just one of many girls who follow the groups and make themselves sexually available to musicians and their hangers-on (a type represented by Forever More's road manager Jimmy, played by Gilbert Wynne). When the band go on tour she is left behind. For some time she lives on the streets with Pogo (Robert D'Aubigny, credited as "Robert Daubigny"), a gentle hippie drifter who is eventually killed in a road accident.

After the accident Suzy meets Fiona again. She becomes accepted as part of Forever More's entourage, and develops the glamorous style and hard attitude of an experienced groupie. She makes a play for Lee and ousts Fiona from her status as his 'old lady.' In the final scene, the band are about to leave their hotel when Suzy finds Fiona in the bathroom with her wrists slashed. She walks out, abandoning her former friend.

Cast

Production

Music
Forever More were a genuine performing band, although the band members play characters other than themselves in the film. Songs from the soundtrack appear on their album Yours – Forever More. Alan Gorrie went on to commercial success as a member of the Average White Band.

The cult folk band Comus provided the film's opening title theme and other incidental music and songs.

Also featured were Titus Groan.

Release

Home media

Permissive was released on DVD and Blu-ray in the UK as part of the BFI's Flipside series on 25 January 2010. The disc also includes the feature film Bread (directed by Stanley Long, 1971) and the short 'Ave You Got a Male Assistant Please Miss? (Graham Jones, Jon Astley, 1973).

References

External links 
 Permissive at the Internet Movie Database

1970 films
British drama films
Films about groupies
1970s British films